Paul McGettigan (born 1957/8) is a former Gaelic footballer, manager and barrister. He played inter-county football for Donegal and Galway. His club career included time with Donegal club St Eunan's and Galway clubs Salthill, St Grellan's and Corofin. He played in midfield.

Early life and education
McGettigan was born to footballer James "Gouldie" McGettigan and his wife Cora (née Embleton). He was one of four daughters and seven sons (including fellow Donegal footballer Leslie). One of McGettigan's brothers died at the age of sixteen in 1986 and another at the age of forty in 2009.

McGettigan attended Gormanston College in East Meath. With them he was part of the 1973 All-Ireland Hogan Cup winning team that saw off St Jarlath's College of Tuam in the final.

McGettigan attended University College Galway where he studied commerce and played in the Sigerson Cup with the university football team.

Playing career

Club
McGettigan played with various clubs in his time. He reached the final of the All-Ireland Senior Club Football Championship with St Grellan's in 1980 but they lost to St Finbarr's. He won a Donegal Senior Football Championship with St Eunan's in 1983.

Inter-county
McGettigan made his senior-inter-county debut for Donegal against Leitrim in the National Football League at the age of sixteen. The next year he won his first Ulster Senior Football Championship medal when Donegal defeated Down following a replay. Thus he contested the 1974 All-Ireland Senior Football Championship, when Donegal fell to Galway at the semi-final stage. He was still a minor in 1974 and played both the Ulster MFC and SFC semi-finals on the same day.

Having moved to live and work in Galway, McGettigan took up inter-county football with that county in 1978, and was part of a side that contested a Connacht final in his first year there (Roscommon won that contest). McGettigan, however, reversed his earlier decision and returned to play for Donegal in 1983 — just in time to win a second Ulster Senior Football Championship medal. McGettigan's return was pivotal; he  partnered under-21 player Anthony Molloy at centrefield in the Ulster final, which meant Michael Lafferty could revert to his normal centre-back and Martin Griffin to his normal full-back position.

Again though, Donegal met Galway in the All-Ireland semi-final and, again, Galway secured a win.

Provincial
McGettigan played for Ulster in the Railway Cup at a time when he was the only Donegal inclusion on that team.

Coaching
McGettigan led Corofin to that club's first All-Ireland Senior Club Football Championship title in 1998. He had previously coached the club's minor team but took over as senior manager in 1997, following many of the players he had coached as young men, and on the proviso that Tony Murphy would be joint manager.

Honours
 Hogan Cup: 1973
 Galway Senior Football Championship: 1979, 1980
 All-Ireland Senior Club Football Championship runner-up: 1980
 Donegal Senior Football Championship: 1983
 Ulster Senior Football Championship: 1974, 1983

Personal life
McGettigan resides on the coastal resort of Salthill. He is married to Geraldine, originally from Claremorris, who is the sister of Jimmy Duggan (which is where McGettigan's involvement with Corofin originated).

References

1950s births
Living people
All-Ireland Senior Club Football Championship winning managers
Alumni of the University of Galway
Corofin Gaelic footballers
Donegal inter-county Gaelic footballers
Gaelic football managers
Irish barristers
Salthill-Knocknacarra Gaelic footballers
St Eunan's Gaelic footballers
St Grellan's Gaelic footballers
Ulster Gaelic footballers
University of Galway Gaelic footballers